Brian Klugman (born September 15, 1975) is an American actor, screenwriter, and director. In 2012 he debuted as a co-director with Lee Sternthal on the film The Words, which they both co-wrote as well.

Early life
Klugman was born in the suburbs of Philadelphia, Pennsylvania. His father, Gerald, is a real estate broker, and his mother, Helen, is a school teacher. He has an older brother, Jeffrey, a younger sister, Laurie, and a younger brother, Michael. His paternal grandfather, Reuben, is actor Jack Klugman's brother. He graduated from Germantown Academy and attended Carnegie Mellon University for two years.

Career
His most recent role has been Dr. Oliver Wells in Bones. He appeared in Cloverfield, The Bogus Witch Project, Dreamland, Joan of Arcadia, Can't Hardly Wait, and National Lampoon's Adam & Eve. He also played Kirby Gardner, a student, in several episodes of Frasier.

Klugman appeared in the 2009 horror/thriller Vacancy 2: The First Cut in the role of "Reece".

Klugman is also credited with the story for 2010's Tron: Legacy with Lee Sternthal, and Edward Kitsis and Adam Horowitz, the duo who wrote the screenplay.

Filmography

Film

Television

References

External links
 

Male actors from Philadelphia
American male film actors
American male television actors
Film directors from Pennsylvania
Living people
1975 births
20th-century American male actors
21st-century American male actors
Carnegie Mellon University alumni
American television writers
Writers from Philadelphia
American male screenwriters
Germantown Academy alumni
American male television writers
Jewish American male actors